Sly, ovvero La leggenda del dormiente risvegliato (English: Sly, or The Legend of the Sleeper Awoken) is an opera in three acts by Ermanno Wolf-Ferrari to an Italian libretto by Giovacchino Forzano, based on the Induction to Shakespeare's The Taming of the Shrew. It was premiered at La Scala in Milan in 1927.

History 
The libretto of Sly was written, originally for Puccini, by Giovacchino Forzano, based on the Induction (the Prologue) to Shakespeare's The Taming of the Shrew. Ermanno Wolf-Ferrari composed it for a premiere at La Scala in Milan in 1927.

Plot and music 
The first act is rather light-hearted, but verismo elements come into play when the tragedy begins to unfold in the later acts.

In the first act, the poet Sly is drinking in a London tavern, with people revelling and arguing. The musical highlight is Sly's song of the dancing bear, a theme that recurs throughout the opera. There are reminiscences of Kurt Weill and Leoncavallo. In the second act, the drunk Sly wakes up in a palace and is made to believe that he is its owner who was in a coma for 10 years, and that he has a wife, Dolly. In their first duet, verismo elements become heard. They culminate in the third act when he realises the truth: "No, io non sono un buffone". He kills himself, slashing his wrists, only to find out that Dolly loves him.

Performance history 
Sly was first performed at La Scala in Milan on 29 December 1927 with Aureliano Pertile and Mercedes Llopart. The latter was a last minute replacement for Margaret Sheridan who became ill days before the performance. Dresden and Hannover were the first German cities to hear it, during the autumn, while Nino Piccaluga and Gina Cigna sang it in Trieste.

During 1929 the work spread to Venice and Naples, with Carmelo Alabiso and Giuseppe Taccani respectively in the title role. The work started to disappear from Italian stages, but was widely performed in Germany and neighboring countries. Its German version remained in the repertory until the start of the Second World War, being heard somewhere or other practically every year until then. Outside Germany and Italy it was also given in Antwerp, the Hague, Budapest and Riga.

It more or less disappeared for some years, but had a spate of revivals in Germany in the 1950s culminating with a performance in Hanover in 1982, which was repeated next year. Its first modern performance in Italian took place in Zürich. That cast was headed by tenor José Carreras. Slys United States premiere took place at the Washington National Opera in spring 1999, again with José Carreras. Also, there were productions at the Metropolitan Opera, New York City, in April 2002 and at the Gran Teatre del Liceu in Barcelona. The last premiere of the opera was co-produced by the Hungarian State Opera and the National Theatre of Szeged in May 2016 in Budapest.

Roles

Recordings 
The creators of the main roles, including Aureliano Pertile, never recorded anything from the opera, although Ernesto Badini (the first John Plake) and Palmiro Domenichetti recorded the "duetto dei beoni". The "Canzone dell'orso" was done by Nino Piccaluga, who sang the work in Turin and Trieste, while both that and "No, non sono un buffone" was recorded by several other singers including Francesco Merli and Alessandro Valente.

The complete opera was recorded in German at the Staatsoper Hannover after a series of live performances in 1982, with Hans-Dieter Bader in the title role, Deborah Polaski as Dolly, and chorus and orchestra conducted by Robert Maxym.

The complete opera on Legato Classics was conducted on May 17, 1998 by Rafael Frühbeck de Burgos, with José Carreras (Sly), Juan Pons (The Count of Westmoreland), Daniela Dessi (Dolly), Carlos Chausson (John Plake), Piotr Beczala (A French Nobleman), Martin Zysset (A Negro), Volker Vogel (An Indian), Peter Keller  (An Old Servant), Rudolf Hartmann (A Chinese), Jee-Hyun Kim (A Doctor), Stefania Kaluza (The Innkeeper), Capucine Chiaudani (Rosalina), Rory Bain (Snare), Gabriela Palikkruscheva (A Page), Miroslav Christoff (A Waiter), Anderson Marks (A Judge), Juuso Hemminski (A Soldier), and Heikki Yrttiaho (A Cook).

In 2000, the opera was recorded with Carreras and chorus and orchestra of the Liceu in Barcelona, published by Koch-Schwann.

References

Further reading 
 Warrack, John and West, Ewan (1992), The Oxford Dictionary of Opera, 782 pages, 

Operas by Ermanno Wolf-Ferrari
Italian-language operas
Operas
1927 operas
Operas based on The Taming of the Shrew